Maroun Elias Nimeh Lahham (born 20 July 1948, Irbed, Jordan) is a Jordanian Catholic prelate who served as the first Bishop of Tunis from 2005 to 2010, and the first Archbishop of Tunis from 2010 to 2012. He later served as the Patriarchal Vicar to Jordan of the Latin Patriarchate of Jerusalem from 2012 until his retirement in 2017.

Biography

On June 24, 1972, Lahham was ordained a Catholic priest in Jerusalem. He later became Fidei donum in Dubai and vicar and priest in Jordan.

In 1992, Lahham received his PhD in pastoral theology and catechesis in the Pontifical Lateran University. In 1994, he was appointed rector of the Latin Seminary in Beit Jala.

On September 8, 2005, Lahham was appointed Bishop of Tunis by Pope Benedict XVI and was ordained on October 2 of the same year in the parish church of Beit Jala by Latin Patriarch of Jerusalem, Michel Sabbah.

On May 22, 2010, Pope Benedict XVI raised the Diocese of Tunis to an Archdiocese and gave to Lahham the title of Archbishop of Tunis.

Less than two years later, on January 19, 2012, Lahham was recalled to the Middle East where he became Auxiliary Bishop and vicar of the Latin Patriarchate of Jerusalem for Jordan. He received the title of Titular bishop of Madaba and maintained, as an individual, the dignity of archbishop.

On February 6, 2017, Pope Francis accepted the resignation of Lahham as Auxiliary Bishop of Jordan.

Distinctions
 Commander of the Sacred Military Constantinian Order of Saint George

References

External links

 jeuneafrique.com
 diocesetunisie.org
 eglisesfax.blogspot.com.br
 catholic-hierarchy.org

1948 births
Living people
Roman Catholic archbishops of Tunis
Jordanian Roman Catholic bishops
People from Irbid
Pontifical Lateran University alumni